Sylvian vein may refer to:

 Deep middle cerebral vein, or deep Sylvian vein
 Superficial middle cerebral vein, or superficial Sylvian vein